The 2017 Individual Speedway Australian Championship is a Motorcycle speedway competition organised by Motorcycling Australia (MA) for the Australian Solo Championship.

The four round series will be held between 4 January and 14 January.

The rounds are scheduled for Gillman Speedway in Adelaide on 4 January, Olympic Park Speedway in Mildura on 7 January, Undera Park Speedway in Undera on 11 January, with the fourth and final round to be held at the Loxford Park Speedway in Kurri Kurri on 14 January.

Qualification
The 16 riders announced by Motorcycling Australia were:
 Brady Kurtz (NSW) - Defending champion
 Troy Batchelor (SA)
 Mason Campton (NSW)
 Max Fricke (Vic)
 Jack Holder (NSW)
 Todd Kurtz (NSW)
 Jaimon Lidsey (Vic)
 Sam Masters (NSW)
 Nick Morris (Qld)
 Josh Pickering (NSW)
 Tyron Proctor (Vic)
 Cooper Riordan (Vic)
 Justin Sedgmen (Vic)
 Jordan Stewart (Vic)
 Rohan Tungate (NSW)
 Davey Watt (Qld)

The reserves for the series were announced as: James Davies (Vic), Matthew Gilmore (NSW), Dakota Ballantyne (SA) and Alan McDonald (NSW).

Points System
Points are standard scoring in Motorcycle speedway of 3 (1st), 2 (2nd), 1 (3rd), 0 (4th) per heat race. A bonus point is added for each position in the "A" Final (meaning even 4th gets a point unless a DNF or exclusion) and no points are scored in the "B" Final. The maximum number of points possible per rider in a single round is 19.

Gillman
 Round one
 4 January
  Adelaide, South Australia - Gillman Speedway
 Referee: Ivan Golding
 Top 3 riders to "A" Final, riders 4-7 to "B" Final
 "B" Final winner to "A" Final

Gillman "B" Final
1 - Troy Batchelor
2 - Rohan Tungate
3 - Max Fricke
e - Sam Masters

Gillman "A" Final
1 - Davey Watt
2 - Justin Sedgmen
3 - Troy Batchelor
4 - Nick Morris

Olympic Park
 Round two
 7 January
  Mildura, Victoria - Olympic Park Speedway
 Referee: Brendon Gledhill
 Top 3 riders to "A" Final, riders 4-7 to "B" Final
 "B" Final winner to "A" Final

Olympic Park "B" Final
1 - Justin Sedgmen
2 - Brady Kurtz
3 - Nick Morris
4 - Troy Batchelor

Olympic Park "A" Final
1 - Sam Masters
2 - Max Fricke
3 - Davey Watt
fx - Justin Sedgmen

Undera Park
 Round three
 11 January
  Undera, Victoria - Undera Park Speedway
 Referee: Lyal	Allan
 Top 3 riders to "A" Final, riders 4-7 to "B" Final
 "B" Final winner to "A" Final

Undera Park "B" Final
1 - Max Fricke
2 - Jack Holder
r - Brady Kurtz
fx - Nick Morris

Undera Park "A" Final
1 - Justin Sedgmen
2 - Sam Masters
3 - Max Fricke
4 - Troy Batchelor

Loxford Park
 Round four
 14 January
  Kurri Kurri, New South Wales - Loxford Park Speedway
 Referee: David Mills
 Top 3 riders to "A" Final, riders 4-7 to "B" Final
 "B" Final winner to "A" Final

Loxford Park "B" Final
1 - Nick Morris
2 - Justin Sedgmen
3 - Rohan Tungate
4 - Davey Watt

Loxford Park "A" Final
1 - Brady Kurtz
2 - Nick Morris
3 - Troy Batchelor
4 - Sam Masters

Intermediate classification

 The top 8 riders are automatically seeded to the 2018 Australian Individual Speedway Championship.

References

See also
 Australian Individual Speedway Championship
 Australia national speedway team
 Sports in Australia

Australia
Speedway in Australia